Hawthorne often refers to the American writer Nathaniel Hawthorne.

Hawthorne may also refer to:

Places
Australia
Hawthorne, Queensland, a suburb of Brisbane

Canada
Hawthorne Village, Ontario, a suburb of Milton, Ontario

United States
Hawthorne (Prairieville, Alabama), a plantation house listed on the National Register of Historic Places in Hale County, Alabama
Hawthorne, California
Hawthorne Municipal Airport (California) in Hawthorne, California
Hawthorne, Florida
Hawthorne Township, White County, Illinois
Hawthorne, Iowa
Hawthorne, Louisville, Kentucky
Hawthorne, Minneapolis, Minnesota
Hawthorne, Nevada
Hawthorne Army Depot near Hawthorne, Nevada
Hawthorne, New Jersey
Hawthorne, New York
Hawthorne, Portland, Oregon
Hawthorne, Philadelphia, Pennsylvania
Hawthorne, Washington, D.C.
Hawthorne, Wisconsin, a town
Hawthorne (community), Wisconsin, an unincorporated community
Hawthorne Bridge, Portland, Oregon
Hawthorne Race Course near Chicago, Illinois

Roads
Hawthorne Boulevard (disambiguation)

Other uses
Hawthorne (surname)
Hawthorne (book), by Henry James about Nathaniel Hawthorne's writings
Hawthorne, CA (album), a compilation album by The Beach Boys, released in 2001.
Hawthorne College, former American college
Hawthorne effect, an industrial psychology phenomenon
Hawthorne Heights, an American band
Hawthorne Works, a huge Western Electric facility in Cicero, Illinois
Hawthorne (TV series), a medical drama starring Jada Pinkett Smith
Hawthorne the Hermit Crab, a fictional character in the comic strip Sherman's Lagoon
 Hawthorne (crater), a crater on Mercury
Hawthorne strainer, a bar accessory

See also
 Hawthorn (disambiguation)
Hawthorne House (disambiguation)
Hawthorne Nevada Airlines Flight 708
Hawthorne station (disambiguation)